Frederiks Brygge (literally: Frederik's Quay") is a waterfront area in the Southern Docklands of Copenhagen, Denmark. It is located at the bottom of Frederiksholmsløbet, a canal that separates Enghave Brygge to the north from Teglholmen to the south.

History
The site was from the 1920s home to the headquarters and main storage of Lemvigh-Müller, a steel wholesaler. Nordea acquired the site in 2006  and Lemvigh-Müller moved to new headquarters in Herlev in 2010. Their old administration building  was converted into youth housing in 2013.

Redevelopment
Nordea Liv & Pension (75 %) and PenSam (25 5)  will be redeveloping the 80,000 square metre site. The masterplan for the area is designed by Design Group Architects. The plans comprise 1,200 apartments, retail and commercial space, 120,000 square metre in total, as well as several new urban spaces.

A 330 m long and five to 10 storeys tall block will shield the waterfront area from busy Vasbygade. The block will surround five individual courtyards and contain 613 rental apartments. The building will be completed in 2019.

References

External links
 Official website

Kongens Enghave